The Boulton & Paul P.64 Mailplane also known as the Mail-Carrier was a 1930s British twin-engined all-metal biplane transport aircraft designed for Imperial Airways and built by Boulton & Paul Ltd.

Development
The airline had a requirement, which was translated into Air Ministry specification 21/28, for a mailplane to carry a  payload on a  leg at a speed of at least . Boulton & Paul designed and constructed the prototype P.64 Mailplane to address these requirements.  The P.64 was a twin-engine two-bay equi-span biplane. It was powered by two Bristol Pegasus IM2 supercharged radial engines rated at  driving two-bladed fixed pitch propellers and mounted under the upper wings.

The aircraft (registered G-ABYK) first flew in March 1933 at the company Norwich. It was not a success, deemed to be expensive and unsatisfactory. It was destroyed during trials at Martlesham Heath when it struck the ground during an unexplained dive on 21 October 1933.

The company then addressed the specification's requirements with a new design transport aircraft which was lighter, slimmer and longer (the Boulton Paul P.71A).

Specifications (P.64 Mailplane)

See also

References
Notes

Bibliography

Mailplane
1930s British mailplanes
Biplanes
Aircraft first flown in 1933
Twin piston-engined tractor aircraft